Qazaq Khan Cherkes was a military commander in Safavid Iran of Circassian origin, who also served as the governor (beglarbeg) of Shirvan (1624–1633) and Astarabad (1639–1640). A high-ranking member of the gholam military corps, he was furthermore appointed head of the Qaramanlu and Keneslu Qizilbash troops by then incumbent king Abbas I (r. 1588–1629) as part of the latters' policy to diminish the political influence of the Qizilbash. In 1632, during king Safi's (r. 1629–42) bloody purges, his relative, the prominent Circassian courtier Yusuf Agha was murdered, while Qazaq Khan Cherkes was deposed and imprisoned in 1633. He nevertheless later returned on the political scene in the last years of Safi's reign, when he was given a new governorship in 1639. His son Najafqoli Khan Cherkes would hold several influential positions as well.

Sources
  
 
 

Safavid governors of Shirvan
Iranian people of Circassian descent
Safavid ghilman
Safavid generals
Prisoners and detainees of Safavid Iran
Safavid governors of Astarabad
17th-century people of Safavid Iran
Safavid slaves